Solaure-en-Diois is a commune in the Drôme department of southeastern France. The municipality was established on 1 January 2016 and consists of the former communes of Aix-en-Diois and Molières-Glandaz.

See also 
Communes of the Drôme department

References 

Communes of Drôme
Communes nouvelles of Drôme
Populated places established in 2016

2016 establishments in France